Trukhino is a rural locality (a village) in Izboishchskoye Rural Settlement, Chagodoshchensky District, Vologda Oblast, Russia. The population was 56 as of 2002.

Geography 
Semovo is the nearest rural locality.

References 

Rural localities in Chagodoshchensky District